Feng Aigang (born 20 December 1975) is a Chinese former wrestler who competed in the 1996 Summer Olympics.

References

External links
 

1975 births
Living people
Olympic wrestlers of China
Wrestlers at the 1996 Summer Olympics
Chinese male sport wrestlers
Wrestlers at the 1998 Asian Games
Asian Games competitors for China
21st-century Chinese people
20th-century Chinese people